Cactobrosis longipennella is a species of snout moth in the genus Cactobrosis. It was described by George Hampson in 1901 and is found in Mexico.

The wingspan is 34–40 mm for males and 33–43 mm for females.

The larvae probably feed on Ferocactus species.

References

Moths described in 1901
Phycitini